Castel San Niccolò is a comune (municipality) in the Province of Arezzo in the Italian region Tuscany, located about   northwest of Arezzo and about  east of Florence.

Castel San Niccolò borders the following municipalities: Castelfranco Piandiscò, Loro Ciuffenna, Montemignaio, Ortignano Raggiolo, Poppi, Pratovecchio Stia, Reggello.

Sister cities
 Pégomas, France

References

External links

 Official website

Cities and towns in Tuscany